Paradise Club may refer to:
Paradise Rock Club, Boston
Smalls Paradise, New York City
Paradise Club (Atlantic City, New Jersey)
The Paradise Club, a BBC TV programme
 The Paradise, a fictional theatre featured in the film, Phantom of the Paradise

See also
Paradise (disambiguation)
Paradise Theatre (disambiguation)